Voloshin, Woloshin,Wolloshin, Voloshyn or Woloshyn (Cyrillic: Волошин) is a Ukrainian and Russian masculine surname. It comes from the dated exonym Volokh ("Vlach", "Romanian"). Its feminine forms are Voloshina, Woloshina, Voloshyna or Woloshyna.

People

Voloshin, Voloshina
Aleksandr Voloshin (born 1956), Russian politician and businessman
Leonid Voloshin (born 1966), Russian triple jumper
Maximilian Voloshin (1877–1932), Ukrainian-born Russian poet
Mikhail Voloshin (1953–2020), Russian-American theoretical physicist
Sergei Voloshin (born 1953), Russian-American nuclear physicist
Vera Voloshina (1919–1941), Russian partisan
2009 Voloshina, main-belt asteroid named after Vera

Voloshyn, Voloshyna
Anna Voloshyna (born 1991), Ukrainian synchro swimmer
Avgustyn Voloshyn (1874–1945), Ukrainian politician, teacher, and essayist
Dmytro Voloshyn (disambiguation), multiple people
Nazar Voloshyn (born 2003), Ukrainian footballer
Oleg Voloshyn (born 1981), Russian-Ukrainian journalist
Vikentiy Voloshyn (born 2001), Ukrainian footballer
Vyacheslav Voloshyn (born 1952), Ukrainian scientist

Woloshyn
Bruce Woloshyn (born 1964), American digital effects artist and supervisor
Illya Woloshyn, Canadian actor
Stan Woloshyn (born 1939), Canadian politician
Ted Woloshyn (born 1953), Canadian broadcaster

See also
 
 
 

Russian-language surnames
Ukrainian-language surnames